is a manga magazine mobile app developed by DeNA. It was launched on December 4, 2013 as free app for iOS and Android devices and as a website platform. The app hosts manga by Kodansha, Shogakukan, and other manga publishers. Mangaka Shin Kibayashi serves as editor-in-chief of the app and pens several of the app's titles under his numerous pseudonyms. In addition to the original manga series run on Manga Box, several of the titles on the app are based on existing works, including Ghost in the Shell, Kindaichi Case Files, Attack on Titan, The Knight in the Area, Space Dandy, Fatal Frame, and Ultraman.

Features
The app is available in Japanese, English, and Chinese in 140 countries and regions around the world. Issues are posted on a weekly basis with the twelve most recent issues being accessible to users for free. Additionally, users can read the first 100 pages of a title in the Digest section of the app. Most titles are serialized weekly, on any given day of the week.

List of series run in Manga Box
Series Title - The English title of the series, either used officially by Manga Box or unofficially by ANN or elsewhere, is shown first, then the Japanese title (if different from the English title) and then the romanized Japanese title (if appropriate). If there is no English title, the romanized title is then used.

Mangaka/Artist and Author - If the series is authored and drawn by one person (or group), they will be listed in the Mangaka/Artist column (as the mangaka). If the series is a collaboration between an artist and author, the artist is shown in the third column and then the author in the fourth.

First and Last Issue - The first issue a series appeared on in Manga Box as well as the final issue. Displayed as formatted on the Kodansha Comic Plus website.

English - Answers whether or not a series was translated into English by Manga Box. This does not include other translators or publishers.

Translation Status - Tells the English translation status of a series. Complete (in green) if a series was fully translated, Ongoing (in green) if a currently serialized series is actively translated, Stopped (in red) if the series was only partly translated, and N/A (in yellow) which is not applicable as the series was never translated in the first place. Translation Status does not included extra chapters found in tankōbon and only covers chapters serialized in Manga Box.

References

External links
 Official Site (English)
 Official Site (Japanese)
 Official Site (Chinese)

Computer-related introductions in 2013
Android (operating system) software
DeNA
IOS software
Manga hosting services